Francis Ogbonna Nwifuru is a Nigerian politician, entrepreneur and administrator who served as two-terms Speaker of Ebonyi State House of Assembly. He currently emerged the winner of Ebonyi State APC 2023 gubernatorial candidate. Rt. Hon. Francis Nwifuru currently serves as the State Representatives representing Izzi West constituency at the State Legislature. He is the speaker of the 5th and 6th Ebonyi State House of Assembly who is aspiring to be Ebonyi State governor in 2023.

References 

People from Ebonyi State
21st-century Nigerian politicians
21st-century Nigerian businesspeople
Living people
Year of birth missing (living people)
Politicians from Ebonyi State